Zakithi Nene (born 2 April 1998) is a South African sprinter, who specializes in the 400 metres.

He won the South African 400m national title in 2021 and qualified for the 2020 Summer Olympics through his world ranking.
He competed in the 400 metres where he ran a time of 45.74 seconds.

Personal life
He studied economics at the University of KwaZulu-Natal in his native South Africa.

References

External links
 

1998 births
Living people
Athletes (track and field) at the 2020 Summer Olympics
Olympic athletes of South Africa
South African male sprinters
People from Ladysmith, KwaZulu-Natal
University of KwaZulu-Natal alumni
Universiade silver medalists for South Africa
Universiade medalists in athletics (track and field)
Medalists at the 2019 Summer Universiade